Trailing the Killer, also known as Call of the Wilderness and Lobo, is a 1932 American film directed by Herman C. Raymaker and released by Sono Art-World Wide Pictures.

Premise 
The film follows a dog in his pursuit of a mountain lion, with various adventures, including killing a rattlesnake, along the way.

Cast 
Caesar the Dog as Lobo
Francis McDonald as Pierre LaPlant
Heinie Conklin as Windy
Joe De La Cruz as Pedro
Pedro Regas as Manuel
Tom London as Sheriff

External links 

1932 films
1932 adventure films
American black-and-white films
Films about dogs
American adventure films
Films produced by B. F. Zeidman
Films directed by Herman C. Raymaker
1930s English-language films
1930s American films